Krzysztof Jan Żegocki (1618 in Rostarzewo – 11 August 1673 in Gościeszyn) was a commander of partisan units which fought with Sweden during 1655–1659. He was also a voivod of Inowrocław (since 1666), bishop of Chełm (since 1670), starosta of Babimost (since 1645) and Konin (since 1660), supporter of Michał Korybut Wiśniowiecki.

References
 

17th-century Roman Catholic bishops in the Polish–Lithuanian Commonwealth
1618 births
1673 deaths